Acleris simpliciana is a species of moth of the family Tortricidae. It is found in North America, where it has been recorded from Indiana, Manitoba, New York, Ohio and Ontario.

The wingspan is about 11 mm. The forewings are pale yellow with a grey patch along the costa and a dark spot in the antemedial area near the inner margin. The hindwings are whitish with yellowish shading near the apex. Adults have been recorded on wing from July to August.

References

Moths described in 1879
simpliciana
Moths of North America